Bushra al-Tawil is a Palestinian journalist, former Palestinian prisoner and prisoners' rights activist from Ramallah. She is the spokesperson for the Aneen Al-Qaid Media Network, a local news agency specialized in covering news about the Palestinian detainees, and political prisoners. Her father is Jamal al-Tawil, a prominent Hamas leader, former mayor of Al-Bireh, and former prisoner and has spent many years in prison. Her husband Mohammed al-Tawil has been imprisoned since August 19, 2002 and is serving nine life sentences in Israeli prisons. She has three brothers.

Arrests 

Al-Tawil was arrested in 2011 at the age of 18 by Israeli authorities and sentenced to 16 months in prison but freed five months later as part of the Gilad Shalit prisoner exchange. On July 1, 2014 she was rearrested and had her former sentence reimposed by a military court, she served the remainder eleven months in prison. She was released in May 2015.

On November 1, 2017 she was again arrested and on November 7 ordered to administrative detention, incarceration without trial or charge. She spent eight months in prison.

On December 11, 2019, she was again arrested and sentenced to administrative detention on December 16. She is currently held in the Hasharon prison in northern Israel.

On November 8, 2020, she was again arrested.

Education and career 

Al-Tawil graduated from the Modern University College in Ramallah in 2013 where she studied journalism and photography. After her studies, she began working at the Aneen Al-Qaid Media Network, which she is the spokesperson for.

External links 
 Bushra al-Taweel , February 20, 2018. Addameer.

References 

Palestinian hunger strikers
Imprisoned journalists
Living people
Palestinian human rights activists
Palestinian people imprisoned by Israel
People from Al-Bireh
Palestinian women journalists
Year of birth missing (living people)
People from Ramallah